USS Cooper: Return to Ormoc Bay is a 2005 Philippine documentary film produced by Bigfoot Entertainment and directed by Daniel Foster. The film documents the fate of an American destroyer that was torpedoed during World War II.

Synopsis 
A daring world record scuba dive to the sunken  is witnessed by a man who nearly perished on that same ship over sixty years ago.

Traveling to dangerous depths, this film takes the time to remember fallen heroes, honor comrades and acknowledge those who made great sacrifices.
The film explores the state of tragedy, the incomprehension we face when confronted with great, unspeakable loss.

This documentary features Rob Lalumiere's record-breaking 193-meter dive to place a memorial plaque on the shipwreck.

Production Team 

 Director/director: Daniel Foster
 Producers: Daniel Foster, Leica Cruz
 Executive Producers: Michael Gleissner, Kacy Andrews, Matt Lubetich
 Associate Producer: Jeneth Borlasa
 Director of photography: Eugene Florendo
 Underwater videographer: Jacques Tarnero
 Editors: Daniel Foster, Kristoffer Villarino
 Composer: Mark Ambervill

Interview Subjects 

 Rob Lalumiere: Diver
 Hank Wagener: Survivor
 Richard Sementelli: Eye Witness
 Veda Kelley: Widowed wife

CGI and animation 
CGI and animation were crucial design elements in USS Cooper: Return to Ormoc Bay. Both were used to fill in story gaps and augment various memories by simulating the USS Cooper and creating movement within charts and old photographs. The night of December 3, 1944, springs to life in the documentary, replete with its inherent terror, chaos and suspense.

Battle scenes feature a recreation of the USS Cooper as it dodges torpedoes, fires off salvos and careens through the moonlit night. The animators extensively researched how the ship sailed, sounded and turned. A model of the ship was created using Maya software, and was given motion, lighting and texture to bring it to life. Other key elements in these scenes involve accurate portrayal of waves, torpedo trajectories and munitions fire. In the documentary USS Cooper: Return to Ormoc Bay, the USS Cooper sails once again.

The animators brought subtle movement to 1940s photographs and documents donated by survivors and their families into which they breathed on new life, such as cigarette smoke wafts from a cigarette, sailors' hats soar in the air and champagne bursts from a bottle during the USS Cooper dedication ceremonies.

Since the documentary involves the complicated sport of technical diving, the CGI team also animated dive charts and decompression and gas mixing schedules to convey the intricacy of the dive, as well as the danger involved.

External links
 
 Official Website
 Distributor's site

2006 films
Asian-American war films
Documentary films about World War II
Philippine documentary films
2006 documentary films
2000s English-language films
2000s American films